Pei Fang (born 1 February 1972) is a former Chinese track and field athlete, who specialized in sprinting events.

Affiliated to the Shanghai's track and field team, she took part in the National Games of China, competing in the 100 metres event. She won her heat in 11.16 seconds. In the semi-finals, she finished second and clocked 11.09 seconds, 0.06 s behind Sichuan runner Liu Xiaomei.

In the final, she finished fourth in 11.10 s in a race won Li Xuemei in 10.79 s. Liu Xiaomei won the silver medal in 10.89 s and twice Olympian Tian Yumei took the bronze, crossing the line in 11.06 s.

Pei's career seems to have ended with those National Games, as she did not compete in any competitions after 1997.

Achievements

Records

References
 
 All-Athletics profile

1972 births
Living people
Chinese female sprinters
Runners from Shanghai
20th-century Chinese women